Jimami Tofu is a 2017 Singaporean-Japanese drama film written, produced and directed by Jason Chan and Christian Lee, starring Japanese actress Mari Yamamoto. Produced by Singapore-based BananaMana Films and supported by the Okinawa Convention and Visitors Bureau and the Okinawa Prefecture's Film Tourism Promotion Project, it made its world premiere at the 2017 Hawaii International Film Festival where it won the Audience Choice Award for Best Narrative Feature Film.

Plot
A Chinese-Singaporean chef Ryan returns to Okinawa, Japan, in search of his lost love Yuki. Instead, he discovers the art of traditional Okinawan cuisine and finds new love in Nami, a childhood friend of Yuki.

Cast
 Jason Chan as Ryan
Mari Yamamoto as Yuki
 Rino Nakasone as Nami
 Masane Tsukayama as Sakamoto
 Christian Lee as Marcus

Notes
Jimami tofu or peanut tofu is a specialty of Okinawa Prefecture. "Jimami" is "peanuts" in the Okinawan language.

References

External links
 
 

2017 films
Singaporean drama films
Japanese drama films
2010s Japanese films